Upper Pohatcong is an unincorporated community and census-designated place (CDP) located within Pohatcong Township in Warren County, New Jersey, United States, that was defined as part of the 2010 United States Census. As of the 2010 Census, the CDP's population was 1,781.

Geography
According to the United States Census Bureau, the CDP had a total area of 0.656 square miles (1.700 km2), all of which was land.

Demographics

Census 2010

References

Census-designated places in Warren County, New Jersey
Pohatcong Township, New Jersey